Ernest Oliver Gidden,  (15 March 1910 – 20 December 1961), known as Mick Gidden, was awarded the George Cross for the "great gallantry and undaunted devotion to duty" he showed while defusing mines and bombs during the Blitz in London.

Early life
Gidden was born in Hampstead on 15 March 1910, and attended University College School in Hampstead.

War service
Gidden joined the Royal Navy Volunteer Reserve as a temporary sub-lieutenant in 1940.

Gidden was awarded the George Medal for defusing a mine that had fallen between two houses in Harlesden in 1940. The notice for this award appeared in the London Gazette of 14 January 1941.

George Cross
On the night of 16/17 April 1941, a Luftwaffe air raid had destroyed several trains, halted underground services and prompted the evacuation of the War Office after an unexploded bomb was found on Hungerford Bridge, the main bridge into Charing Cross Station.

Gidden found the mine had come to rest across the railway's live high voltage line and that he would have to turn it over to reach the fuse.  Working from dawn, it took six hours for him to make the device safe, at times having to ease the distorted casing back with a hammer and chisel where it had melted onto the live 'third rail'.

Notice of the award appeared in the London Gazette of 9 June 1942, reading:

Later war career
Gidden rose to command a mine clearance section and was promoted to the rank of lieutenant commander in 1942. He was appointed to HMS Nile, Egypt at that time. In 1944 he was Staff Officer to the Commander in Chief, Mediterranean (HMS Byrsa), and took part in the clearance of mines from the Scheldt channel in November 1944. He returned to HMS President in London in 1945.

Post-war career
Gidden returned to civilian life at the war's end. He died in 1961 and was cremated at Golders Green Crematorium, London, on 23 December 1961. He is commemorated on his family grave at Hampstead Parish Church.

Gidden's story and medals were exhibited by his son, Michael, on the Antiques Roadshow in February 2003. The expert valued them at £16,000.

References

British recipients of the George Cross
Royal Navy recipients of the George Cross
Royal Naval Volunteer Reserve personnel of World War II
Bomb disposal personnel
1961 deaths
1910 births
Recipients of the George Medal
Officers of the Order of the British Empire